Sunfish Creek State Forest is a state forest in Monroe County, Ohio, United States.

References

External links
 U.S. Geological Survey Map at the U.S. Geological Survey Map Website. Retrieved November 21st, 2022.

Ohio state forests
Protected areas of Monroe County, Ohio